This list of botanical gardens and arboretums in Georgia is intended to include all significant botanical gardens and arboretums in the U.S. state of Georgia

See also
List of botanical gardens and arboretums in the United States

References 

 
Arboreta in Georgia (U.S. state)
botanical gardens and arboretums in Georgia (U.S. state)